Bolivilaelaps is a genus of mites in the family Laelapidae.

Species
 Bolivilaelaps tricholabiatus Fonseca, 1940

References

Laelapidae